Detroit/Hamtramck Assembly, also called Factory Zero, is a General Motors automobile assembly plant straddling the border between Detroit and Hamtramck, Michigan. It is located about three miles (five km) from GM's corporate headquarters. When the facility opened, it was built on the original "Dodge Factory" location that was built in 1911, which was closed in 1980 and demolished in 1981, and the new GM factory built vehicles for GM's "BOC" (Buick/Oldsmobile/Cadillac) Group. The first vehicle, a Cadillac Eldorado, rolled off the assembly line on February 4, 1985.

It replaced GM's Detroit Assembly on Clark Avenue, south of Michigan Avenue (U.S. Route 12) in Detroit which was the main facility for all Cadillacs starting in 1921. It is about one mile west of the former Packard Automotive Plant.

The plant builds vehicles for GM's Chevrolet, GMC and Cadillac divisions and had approximately 1,800 hourly and salaried employees in early 2017, and 924 in late 2022. Since opening in 1985, more than 4 million vehicles have been built at the plant.

As of May 2020, the plant is being retooled to produce electric vehicles, including the all-new GMC Hummer EV.

History

Dodge (1911–1980)
The Dodge Factory, or "Dodge Main" as it became known, occupied  on the edge of the village of Hamtramck, which is surrounded by the city of Detroit. Plant 4, on Conant Avenue, was separated only from the main plant structures by a railroad right-of-way, which was also the boundary line between the two cities. The plant started off as just a few buildings but it grew rapidly as needed, where it ended up as 35 separate buildings, to include a foundry, before it was demolished. The original plant was designed by noted industrial designer and architect Albert Kahn Associates but were replaced in 1912 by the architectural firm of Smith, Hinchman & Grylls, due to a disagreement with the Dodge brothers. Reflecting an engineering philosophy the brothers shared, the plant was vastly overbuilt.

There were two railroads crossing the area, and plenty of open land at the time. One of the railroad lines went north to the nearby Highland Park Ford Plant which had just opened earlier. The original intent was to continue providing parts and subassemblies, and ship them to Ford. It also included the first time a car manufacturer used a vehicle test track, including a portion where newly manufactured cars would drive up a ramp, to test the powertrain durability and the brakes on the way down.

John and Horace had grown up on factory floors and machine shops, and they made sure their employees were well cared for. The Dodge facility had a complete medical facility, with doctors and nurses on duty at all times, an efficient plant security department, and a well-equipped firefighting department with direct contact with the local Hamtramck Fire Department. 
The plant included a "welfare department" which looked after workers’ social needs and, reflecting the innovative nature of the Dodge brothers, a machine shop they called "the Playpen" where employees who wanted to fix or invent things could indulge in their ideas after hours. The facility had an executive dining room for senior plant and corporate officials, and a cafeteria for office and plant employees, complete with a fully equipped kitchen; a smaller facility in Plant 4 prepared hot food for distribution directly to the factory areas via small trolleys. The factory was approximately two miles south of Lynch Road Assembly which built Plymouth products exclusively until 1962. When the Chrysler C platform was introduced in 1965, the factory manufactured Dodge and Plymouth products that shared the platform.

General Motors 
The  site was home to a large Polish community that was part of an area that is sometimes referred to as Poletown.  4,200 residents, 1,400 homes, several churches (including Immaculate Conception Church) and 140 businesses, including the old Dodge factory, were located on the proposed site. The residential area was north of the Dodge facility. GM's acquisition of part of the property through eminent domain, and the subsequent clearing of this section of the neighborhood, was the subject of various protests and court battles. Eventually the case went to the Michigan Supreme Court which ruled in favor of General Motors stating that economic development is a legitimate use of eminent domain.  Detroit Mayor Coleman Young sided with GM, seeking new jobs and investments.

It is south of a former GM facility, called Chevrolet Gear & Axle Division, which was the combination of two former factories, called Detroit Gear and Axle, plus Detroit Forge, which had occupied the location at Holbrook Avenue to the south, Lumpkin Street to the east, Poland Avenue to the north and I-75 to the west. The factories were demolished in 2014, having occupied the location since 1917.

While some residents protested, others supported the efforts to build the new plant. Gary Campbell, a Poletown resident and bar owner, accused those opposing the new plant of presenting opinions of a small minority as if they represented the entire neighborhood.  The controversy led to national news attention and the involvement of Ralph Nader and the Gray Panthers.  Protests centered around the Immaculate Conception Roman Catholic Church. The Detroit Archdiocese supported the relocations and had already agreed to sell the two Catholic churches that were in the area.  However, Joseph Karasiewicz, the priest at one of the parishes, defied his local Cardinal and fought to keep his building from being sold.  The Archdiocese stood firm in its support of the sale.  A 29-day sit-in at the Immaculate Conception Church came to an end on July 14, 1981 when police forcibly evicted 20 people from the church.  Twelve people were arrested; only three of the twelve arrested were from Poletown.  Shortly afterward, the site targeted for the plant was razed and construction began on the new $500 million auto assembly plant.  The controversy inspired at least one short film:  "Poletown Lives!"

A small Jewish cemetery, Beth Olem, occupies part of the grounds of the GM Assembly at the extreme northwest corner of the property, next to the water treatment facility.  The older pre-existing auto plant parking lot engulfed the small cemetery long before General Motors built the new assembly plant.  Visitation is currently limited to twice a year on the Sundays preceding Rosh Hashana and Passover.

GM's Detroit-Hamtramck plant was opened in February 1985. Cadillac K-body production was consolidated there in the 1990s.  The Detroit-Hamtramck Assembly later received the contract for the production of Chevrolet Volt, which uses the Delta II/Voltec body.  On April 21, 2010, GM announced it would invest $121 million into the Detroit/Hamtramck factory to ensure GM could keep up with the demand for the next generation Chevrolet Malibu. In May 2011, GM announced it would invest $69 million in the plant for the Chevrolet Impala.  In 2013, production of the Cadillac ELR (a Cadillac equivalent of the Chevrolet Volt) began, followed two years later by production of the Cadillac CT6 and then the third-generation Buick LaCrosse.

In December 2016, GM announced the elimination of the second shift and 1,300 jobs at the plant in March 2017; less than twelve months after the second shift was added. In October 2017, GM announced to scale back production at the plant as falling sales and excess inventory of sedans made there, resulting in about 200 job lost. On November 26, 2018, GM announced that the plant would be "unallocated" in 2019. The plant has an annual production capacity of 230,000 units. Utilization rate in 2018 was 28 percent. In February, 2019, General Motors (GM) announced that production of the Chevrolet Impala and Cadillac CT6 would continue at Detroit/Hamtramck Assembly until early 2020. With the discontinuation of the CT6 and Impala, the factory is currently in the process of retooling to build electric vehicles, starting with the GMC Hummer EV.

The first GMC Hummer EV Pickup rolled off the assembly line at Factory Zero on December 17, 2021.

Vehicles produced

Chrysler Corp. 

 Dodge 30-35 First Dodge engineered vehicle
 Dodge Series D5/Dodge Series D8 1937,1938
 M1918 light repair truck
 Dodge Aspen / Plymouth Volare 1976-1979
 Dodge Demon 1971-1972
 Dodge Challenger / Plymouth Barracuda 1970-1974
 Dodge Charger 1966-1978
 Dodge Monaco 1964-1978
 Dodge Custom 880 1962-1965
 Dodge 330 1962-1964
 Dodge Dart 1962-1976
 Dodge Polara 1959-1973
 Dodge Matador 1959-1960
 Dodge Lancer 1955-1962
 Dodge Royal 1954-1959
 Dodge Coronet 1949-1976
 Dodge Meadowbrook 1949-1954
 Dodge Wayfarer 1949-1952
 Dodge Custom 1946-1949
 Dodge Deluxe 1946-1949

General Motors 

 Cadillac CT6 2016–2020
 Chevrolet Impala 2014–2020
 Buick LaCrosse 2017–2019
 Cadillac ELR 2014 and 2016
 Chevrolet Malibu 2013–2015
 Holden Volt 2013–2015
 Opel/Vauxhall Ampera 2012–2015
 Chevrolet Volt 2011–2019
 Buick Lucerne 2006–2011
 Cadillac DTS 2006–2011
 Pontiac Bonneville 2004–2005
 Buick LeSabre 2000–2005
 Buick Park Avenue 1997–2005
 Cadillac DeVille 1994–2005
 Buick Riviera 1986–1993
 Oldsmobile Toronado 1986–1992
 Cadillac Allanté 1987–1993
 Cadillac Seville 1986–2004
 Cadillac Eldorado 1986–2000
 GMC Hummer EV 2022-
 Cadillac Escalade IQ 2024-
 Chevrolet Silverado EV 2024-
 GMC Sierra EV 2024-
 Cruise Origin 2024-

See also
 List of Chrysler factories

Further reading

References

External links
 

Chrysler factories
General Motors factories
Motor vehicle assembly plants in Michigan
Hamtramck, Michigan
Industrial buildings and structures in Detroit
Buildings and structures in Wayne County, Michigan
Historic American Engineering Record in Michigan
1911 establishments in Michigan